Bonnieville is a home rule-class city in Hart County, Kentucky, in the United States. The population was 255 at the 2010 census.

History
Founded in 1849, the town was originally known as Bacon Creek, for the stream that runs through the city. It is rumored that the name was changed to Bonnieville because of the popularity of the song "My Bonnie Lies over the Ocean".

On December 26, 1862, the Confederate John Hunt Morgan sent a detachment from Upton to the bridge over Bacon Creek in Bonnieville. A brief firefight with a detachment of the 2nd Michigan Volunteer Cavalry Regiment resulted with the destruction of the bridge for a third time and the wounding of 23. The railroad remained closed for six weeks until the tracks could be repaired and reopened on February 1.

Geography
Bonnieville is located at  (37.374850, -85.903429).

U.S. Route 31W passes through the middle of Bonnieville, with most of the city concentrated around this highway's two intersections with Kentucky Route 728. Bonnieville is accessible from Exit 71 on Interstate 65. Part of the original main line of the historic Louisville and Nashville Railroad (now CSX) passes through the city. Bacon Creek, a tributary of the Nolin River, bisects the city.

Demographics

As of the census of 2000, there were 354 people, 137 households, and 93 families residing in the city. The racial makeup of the city was 97.18% White, 1.69% Black or African American, and 1.13% from two or more races.

There were 137 households, out of which 35.8% had children under the age of 18 living with them, 46.0% were married couples living together, 19.0% had a female householder with no husband present, and 31.4% were non-families. 29.2% of all households were made up of individuals, and 19.7% had someone living alone who was 65 years of age or older. The average household size was 2.58 and the average family size was 3.19.

In the city, the population was spread out, with 30.8% under the age of 18, 7.1% from 18 to 24, 28.0% from 25 to 44, 17.8% from 45 to 64, and 16.4% who were 65 years of age or older. The median age was 35 years. For every 100 females, there were 94.5 males. For every 100 females age 18 and over, there were 87.0 males.

The median income for a household in the city was $25,714, and the median income for a family was $29,250. Males had a median income of $27,321 versus $19,375 for females. The per capita income for the city was $10,583. About 25.3% of families and 29.4% of the population were below the poverty line, including 32.5% of those under age 18 and 41.5% of those age 65 or over.

Notable facts
 Bonnieville was declared as one of the worst speed traps in America by the American Automobile Association in the early 1960s.
 A large Bamboo Research Station is on the south side of town. It is said to contain the largest bamboo collection in the state of Kentucky.
Peppy Martin, the 1999 Republican gubernatorial nominee, resides in Bonnieville.

References

External links

 
 "The Last Speed Trap?". Time. December 2, 1966. Article on American speed traps.

Cities in Kentucky
Cities in Hart County, Kentucky
1849 establishments in Kentucky